Kazuki Watanabe may refer to:

 Kazuki Watanabe (musician) (1981–2000), Japanese musician with the band Raphael
 Kazuki Watanabe (swimmer), Japanese swimmer
 Kazuki Watanabe (motorcyclist) (born 1990), Grand Prix motorcycle racer from Japan